Iryna Krasnianska, born on November 19, 1987 in Vologda, USSR is a World Champion Ukrainian gymnast from Cherkasy, Ukraine. She started gymnastics in 1992. Iryna is the daughter of Nina, an engineer and Vasili, a doctor. Krasnianska was a 2004 Olympian. Krasnianska is primarily known as an uneven bars and balance beam specialist.

Career
Krasnianska competed at the 2003 World Championships in Anaheim, California. At the 2003 World Championships, Krasnyanska competed on uneven bars and balance beam in the team final where the Ukrainian team placed 7th. Individually she placed 7th in both the uneven bars and balance beam event finals. The next year, Krasnianska and the Ukrainian team won the silver medal at the 2004 European Championships. She also won a bronze medal on uneven bars and placed 4th on balance beam. Krasnianska made the 2004 Ukrainian Olympic team. At the Athens Olympic Games, Krasnianska and the Ukrainian team placed 4th, missing the bronze medal by less than a point. Individually, she did not advance to any individual finals.

Krasnianska became a World Champion when she won the Balance Beam final at the 2006 World Gymnastics Championships in Aarhus, Denmark. Krasnianska's routine was notable for its flawless presentation and unique mount. Her score of 15.575 was posted after a nervous ten-minute delay and was enough to clinch the gold medal. Krasnianska competed at the 2007 European Champions where she made the balance beam final but she did not medal. At the same World Championships, Krasnianska and the Ukrainian team placed 5th in the team final. At the 2007 European Championships she placed 7th on balance beam. Iryna travelled to Stuttgart, Germany for the 2007 World Championships, but was forced to sit the events out due to an injury.

Eponymous skill
Krasnianska has one eponymous skill in the Code of Points.

See also
List of Olympic female artistic gymnasts for Ukraine

References

External links

1987 births
Living people
Gymnasts at the 2004 Summer Olympics
Gymnasts at the 2008 Summer Olympics
Olympic gymnasts of Ukraine
Ukrainian female artistic gymnasts
World champion gymnasts
Medalists at the World Artistic Gymnastics Championships
People from Vologda
Originators of elements in artistic gymnastics